Ludwigshafen am Rhein (F264) is the fifth ship of the Braunschweig-class corvette of the German Navy.

Developments 
The K130 Braunschweig class (sometimes Korvette 130) is Germany's newest class of ocean-going corvettes.

They feature reduced radar and infrared signatures ("stealth" beyond the s) and will be equipped with two helicopter UAVs for remote sensing. Recently, the German Navy ordered a first batch of two UMS Skeldar V-200 systems for the use on the Braunschweig-class corvettes. The hangar is too small for standard helicopters, but the pad is large enough for Sea Kings, Lynx, or NH-90s, the helicopters of the German Navy.

The German Navy has ordered the RBS-15 Mk4 in advance, which will be a future development of the Mk3 with increased range —— and a dual seeker for increased resistance to electronic countermeasures. The RBS-15 Mk3 has the capability to engage land targets.

In October 2016 it was announced that a second batch of five more frigates is to be procured from 2022–25. The decision was in response to NATO requirements expecting Germany to provide a total of four corvettes at the highest readiness level for littoral operations by 2018, and with only five corvettes just two can be provided.

Construction and career 
Ludwigshafen was laid down on 14 April 2006 and launched on 26 September 2007 in Hamburg. She was commissioned on 21 March 2013.

KRI Sultan Hasanuddin and Ludwigshafen conducted a towing exercise (TOWEX) on 26 August 2020.

References

Bibliography 
 

Corvettes 
Stealth ships
Braunschweig-class corvettes
2007 ships